The list of shipwrecks in 1793 includes ships sunk, foundered, wrecked, grounded or otherwise lost during 1793.

January

4 January

11 January

18 January

19 January

Unknown date

February

Unknown date

March

2 March

18 March

28 March

Unknown date

April

11 April

Unknown date

May

13 May

Unknown date

June

1 June

Unknown date

July

6 July

Unknown date

August

12 August

13 August

17 August

Unknown date

September

3 September

20 September

Unknown date

October

4 October

8 October

12 October

20 October

Unknown date

November

6 November

9 November

17 November

20 November

21 November

23 November

30 November

Unknown date

December

2 December

10 December

17 December

18 December

Unknown date

Unknown date

References

1793